Muhammad Latif Khosa (Punjabi and ) is a politician representing Pakistan People's Party who has been the Governor of Punjab from 2011 until 2013. He is a lawyer by profession, having been a senior advocate in the Supreme Court of Pakistan and is considered an authoritative legal and constitutional expert of the country. A former senator and a former Attorney General of Pakistan, Latif Khosa was appointed as the Governor of Punjab by the President of Pakistan after the murder of late-Governor Salman Taseer on 11 January 2011. He was appointed the attorney general on 19 August 2008. Khosa also remained Member Pakistan Bar Council for three terms 1990-2005 and served as Chairman of the Executive Committee (CEC) of Pakistan Bar Council. He co-authored an electoral fraud report with former prime minister Benazir Bhutto shortly before her assassination in December 2007. Khosa has been one of Late Banazir Bhutto's top aides.

He belongs to Khosa (tribe) which is a Baloch tribe. Latif Khosa is the founder of Khosa Law Chambers (KLC), one of the top law firm in Pakistan based at Lahore. KLC has also offices in Karachi and Islamabad.

Education

After receiving his early education from Dera Ghazi Khan Punjab, he joined Government College, Lahore from where he did his graduation. During his stay at Government College, he showed excellent results in debate, sports and academics.

After graduation, he joined the Punjab University Law College at Lahore, where he became President of the Punjab University Law College Students Union, and the editor of the college magazine, "Al-Mizan". He was declared the best English debater of 1967 in the Punjab University after winning the "Krishan Kishore Grover Goodwill Gold Medal Declamation Contest". He did his LL.B in 1967 with a top honours for best all round activities in academics, sports and debates.

Professional career

Latif Khosa joined the legal profession at Lahore and enrolled as an advocate of the subordinate Courts in 1968. In 1970, he became an advocate of the High Court and in 1980 as an advocate of the Supreme Court.

During the years 1981; 1983 & 1985, Latif Khosa was selected as the President of High Court Bar Association Multan. In 1990, Khosa was selected as Member Pakistan Bar Council for the first time and subsequently for 2 more terms in 1995 & 2000.

Political career
He has held the portfolios of a Senator (2003-2009), Attorney General (2008-2009) in the Government of Pakistan, Advisor (2010) and also remained Governor of Punjab (2011-2013).

Khosa was also instrumental in the 2007 lawyer's movement for the restoration of dozens of senior judges including Iftikhar Muhammad Chaudhry sacked by former military ruler Pervez Musharraf in 2007.

Khosa has been invited to lecture on the subject of Politics, Diplomacy, Foreign Relations and International Law at universities across the globe.

Senator Khosa appeared before the acting Chief Justice Javaid Iqbal in a hearing over the handling of the Iftikhar Chaudry sacking issue.

Governor Punjab
He was selected as Governor of Punjab in January 2011. The choice of his selection as Governor came after the PPP acquiesced to the PML-N's 10-point agenda to improve relationship between PML(N)'s Punjab Government and that of the PPP federal government.

Khosa has been the key instrument in smooth running of the Punjab Government during his governorship 2011-2013 in spite of issues between the two mainstream political parties PPP (Pakistan People's Party) and PML-N (Pakistan Muslim League-Nawaz)

Secretary General PPP
Khosa was selected as the Secretary General of Pakistan Peoples Party in 2013 and he remained on that post until 2017. He is also the Member of CEC Pakistan People's Party. He is the Central Chairman of the party's Lawyer Wing Peoples Lawyers Forum (PLF) and Election Monitoring Cell of Pakistan Peoples Party.

Attorney general
Soon after the PPP came to power after the 2008 elections; Khosa was selected Attorney-General for Pakistan until 2009. Being attorney general, he represented Pakistan on different International Forums & Judicial Conferences.

Federal Advisor of Information Technology & Communication
He has also been selected as Advisor of Information Technology/Minister Incharge in the cabinet of Prime Minister Yousaf Raza Gilani.
On 20 July 2010, Advisor to Prime Minister Yousaf Raza Gilani on Information Technology/Minister Incharge Sardar Latif Khosa sent his resignation to the president after developing disagreements with the premier.

Senator

Khosa was selected as Senator from Punjab Province in 2003. His name was nominated by late Mohtarma Benazir Bhutto. His senatorship remained in function until 2009.

He has been member of senate Committees for Foreign Affairs, Law Justice and Human Rights, Government Assurances, Committee on Rules of Procedure and Privileges, Senate House Committee, Devolution Process

Bar politics
Khosa has been very active in bar politics and his group has won important Supreme Court Bar Association and Pakistan Bar Council elections over the last 40 years. He has been selected as the president of High Court Bar thrice (1981; 1983; 1985) and as member Pakistan Bar Council three times 1990-2005 (15 years).

Family
Khosa's Family include former Governor Punjab Sardar Zulfiqar Ali Khosa; former Chief Minister Punjab Sardar Dost Muhammad Khosa; former Inspector General Police Tariq Khosa; former Chief Secretary Punjab Nasir Khosa and former Supreme Court Chief Justice Asif Saeed Khosa.

Khosa has 4 sons and 3 daughters. Three of his sons including Sardar Khurram Latif Khosa, Balakh Sher Khosa & Shahbaz Khosa are Advocates Supreme Court of Pakistan. One of his son Dr Faisal Khosa is a renowned Medical Specialist; based in USA.

References 

Pakistani lawyers
Attorneys General of Pakistan
Baloch people
Pakistan People's Party politicians
Living people
Governors of Punjab, Pakistan
People from Dera Ghazi Khan District
Government College University, Lahore alumni
Year of birth missing (living people)
Chairmen of the Pakistan Bar Council
Vice Chairmen of the Pakistan Bar Council
People from Lahore